This list summarizes basic characteristics of steamboats and towed barges placed in service on the Colorado River and its tributaries.  The article Steamboats of the Colorado River expands on the topic.

Steamboats on the Lower Colorado River

Towed barges of the Lower Colorado River
Black Crook 1864-1880s, White Fawn 1864-1880s, Barge #1 1864-1900, Barge #2 1865-1900, Barge #3 1865-1900, Barge #4 1872-1900, Pumpkin Seed 1865-1867, Silas J. Lewis 1900-1909, Enterprise 1901-1909

Steamboats on the Green and Upper Colorado Rivers

References

  Richard E. Lingenfelter, Steamboats on the Colorado River, 1852-1916, University of Arizona Press, Tucson, 1978, pp. 161–165, Appendix A and B

Steamboats in general
 Hunter, Louis C., Steamboats on the Western Rivers, Dover Publications, NY 1947

External links
Richard Frajola: The Western Mails, Steamboat mail of the Colorado River

 
Colorado River
Colorado River
Colorado River, List
Colorado River, List
Colorado River, List
Steamboats Colorado River
Steamboats Colorado River
Steamboats Colorado River
.